On 9 April 1990, the South Down Brigade of the Provisional Irish Republican Army (IRA) detonated a massive improvised land mine under a British Army convoy outside Downpatrick, County Down, Northern Ireland. Four soldiers of the Ulster Defence Regiment (UDR) were killed,  the regiment's greatest loss of life since 1983.

Background

The Provisional IRA had been attacking British Army patrols and convoys with landmines and roadside bombs since the beginning of its campaign in the early 1970s. The deadliest attack was the Warrenpoint ambush of August 1979, when 18 soldiers were killed by two large roadside bombs near Warrenpoint, County Down. In July 1983, four soldiers of the local Ulster Defence Regiment (UDR) were killed when their vehicle struck an IRA landmine near Ballygawley, County Tyrone. It was the UDR's biggest loss of life up until then.

Attack
On the morning of 9 April 1990, two UDR armoured landrovers were travelling from Ballykinler Barracks to Downpatrick. An IRA unit had planted a  improvised landmine in a culvert under the Ballydugan Road, just outside the town. As the landrovers drove over the culvert, the IRA detonated the bomb by command wire. A witness described "a scene of utter carnage". Four soldiers were killed: Michael Adams (23), John Birch (28), John Bradley (25), and Steven Smart (23). It was the biggest loss of life suffered by the UDR since the 1983 Ballygawley landmine attack. The soldiers in the other landrover suffered severe shock and were airlifted to hospital. Police said a civilian driver also suffered shock and another received cuts and bruises.

Aftermath
The bombers escaped on a motorcycle which had been stolen in Newry a week earlier, and was later found abandoned in Downpatrick. The IRA issued a statement saying the attack was carried out by members of its South Down Brigade.

British Prime Minister, Margaret Thatcher, said on BBC radio: You take these murders of these four people today alongside those decisions in the Supreme Court of the Republic not to extradite those accused of violent crime - and one is very, very depressed. Charles Haughey, the Taoiseach of the Republic of Ireland, condemned the attack as an "atrocity".

A 23 year-old man was later sentenced to 15 years in prison for the attack. He had driven a scout car for the bombers when it was planted the day before the attack.

References

Explosions in 1990
Provisional Irish Republican Army actions
1990 in Northern Ireland
Improvised explosive device bombings in Northern Ireland
British Army in Operation Banner
Military actions and engagements during the Troubles (Northern Ireland)
The Troubles in County Down
1990 crimes in the United Kingdom
April 1990 events in the United Kingdom